The Westons Mill Pond is a dammed section of the Lawrence Brook located in the Westons Mills section of East Brunswick, New Jersey, United States. It is one of a series of dams on the Lawrence Brook. The Westons Mill Pond Dam is the dam that controls reservoir output. The Westons Mill Pond is available for boating, although gasoline motors are prohibited due to the highly sensitive wildlife ecosystems found there.

Dam
The dam is found near Route 18 in the outskirts of New Brunswick. Its elevation is 16 feet above sea level. It can be accessed on Burnet Street (Tower Center Boulevard), where the maintenance equipment is stored. There is a second, unofficial dam slightly farther upstream.

See also
List of rivers of New Jersey
Lawrence Brook

References

External links
USGS Coordinates for Westons Mill Pond Dam in Google Maps
USGS Coordinates for Westons Mill Pond in Google Maps (same coordinates)

East Brunswick, New Jersey
Bodies of water of Middlesex County, New Jersey
Reservoirs in New Jersey
Raritan River